Julien Boutter and Fabrice Santoro were the defending champions but only Boutter competed that year with Max Mirnyi.

Boutter and Mirnyi lost in the final 6–4, 6–3 against Arnaud Clément and Nicolas Escudé.

Seeds

  Julien Boutter /  Max Mirnyi (final)
  David Adams /  Michael Hill (quarterfinals)
  Karsten Braasch /  Andrei Olhovskiy (semifinals)
  Chris Haggard /  Tom Vanhoudt (semifinals)

Draw

External links
Main Draw on ATP Archive

Open 13
2002 ATP Tour